Fairview Baptist Church is the Church in Fairview Alpha, Louisiana.

External links
 Fairview Baptist Church
 Facebook

Baptist churches in Louisiana
Natchitoches Parish, Louisiana
Red River Parish, Louisiana